The Chara Sands is an area of sand in Siberia near the Kodar and Udokan mountain ranges. The rapid change from the pine and larch forests and peat bogs to the sand has no transition zone—this is one of the peculiarities of this unusual area, besides the roaming sand dunes and the oases that emerge among them.

The Chara Sands is estimated to have formed during the last glacial period 55 to 100 thousand years ago being what is left of an extinct lake formed by runoff from the Sakukan glacier.

View

References

External links

Chara Sands

Landforms of Siberia
Landforms of Zabaykalsky Krai
Natural monuments of Russia
Deserts of Russia
Dunes of Russia